MRC Human Nutrition Research was the largest research institute in the UK for human nutrition, and was based in Cambridge.

History
In 1998 MRC Human Nutrition Research (HNR) was formed as a result of the restructuring of the Dunn Human Nutrition Unit following the resignation of Professor Roger Whitehead. The Medical Research Council (MRC), founded in 1913, had previously had a Human Nutrition Research Unit at the end of the Second World War; this was founded and directed by BS Platt, and was interested in serious nutritional deficiencies in children, that would cause significantly premature death. HNR was formed in order to continue to advance the MRC's portfolio of strategic and applied nutrition research. In 2016, following restructuring and refocusing of its research interests HNR was renamed MRC Elsie Widdowson Laboratory (MRC EWL).

In December 2018 MRC EWL closed.

Mission
The mission of HNR was to conduct nutrition research and surveillance to improve the health of the population with a focus on obesity and metabolic risk, musculoskeletal health, intestinal health and nutritional inequalities.

Objectives
HNR's four objectives were to: 
Advance knowledge through discovery science, the development of innovative methodologies and the application of specialist expertise in priority areas
Improve health and economic advantage through the exchange of knowledge and technology to inform nutrition policy and practice
Provide opportunities for training and to build capacity for nutrition research
Foster a dialogue with the public on nutrition science and its implications for health

Structure
HNR was based at Peterhouse Technology Park, in south-east Cambridge, on the South Cambridgeshire-Cambridge boundary, round the corner from Fulbourn Hospital. ARM Holdings have their headquarters on the same site.

It was divided into three main research departments and a support department:
 Cellular and Molecular Sciences
 Nutritional Physiology & Biomarkers
 Diet and Population Health
 Scientific Operations & Logistics

These departments housed research groups concerned with:
 Maternal & Child Nutrition
 National Nutrition Surveys
 Nutrition & Bone Health
 Nutritional Interventions
 Obesity & Related Metabolic Disorders
 Nutrition Communications and Translation into Policy & Practice
 Nutrition Epidemiology
 Biomineral Research
 Lipid Profiling and Signalling
 Physiological Modelling of Metabolic Risk
 Dietary Assessment

HNR also had a library which housed an important collection of historically significant research documents.

Function
HNR conducted nutrition research and surveillance to improve the health of the population with a focus on obesity and metabolic risk, musculoskeletal health, intestinal health and nutritional inequalities.

Research
In November 1999 HNR scientists discovered that children in the early 1950s, despite food rationing, had healthier diets than children today. They had a greater intake of calcium, from drinking more milk, and of iron, as they ate more red meat than poultry and iron containing dark green vegetables such as broccoli and kale. In the early 1950s, no children would have eaten pasta, but 50% of children in the 1990s did. However children in the 1950s were faced with more incurable illnesses, prevented today by vaccination.

In September 2002, HNR scientists proved a link between diabetes and being overweight. They found that people who had lost 9 lb in weight had reduced the chances of having diabetes by 58%.

In 2007, a study was conducted to research the effect of negative weight stigmas on patients. The conclusion was that in several cases, the belief in the negative weight stigmas led to overeating and bad health habits in patients who were studies. More details can be found in the official report listed under references.

HNR participated in the National Diet and Nutrition Survey and the MRC's National Survey of Health and Development, which showed insights such as approximately five per cent of the UK's population are vegetarian.

See also
 Obesity in the United Kingdom

References

 HNR

External links
 HNR
 University of Cambridge Research Horizons

News items
 Convenience meals in February 2008
 Children's obesity in March 2007
 Watercress and cancer prevention in February 2007
 Heart disease in May 2004
 Fast food in October 2003
 Whole grain foods in July 2001

Biological research institutes in the United Kingdom
Food science institutes
Government agencies established in 1998
Medical Research Council (United Kingdom)
Medical research institutes in the United Kingdom
Nutrition organizations
Organisations based in Cambridge
Research institutes established in 1998
Research institutes in Cambridge
1998 establishments in the United Kingdom